Huntia is a genus of spiders in the family Zoropsidae.  It was first described in 2001 by Gray & Thompson. , it contains two species, both from Australia.

Species

Huntia comprises the following species:
Huntia deepensis Gray & Thompson, 2001T – Western Australia (including Queensland)
Huntia murrindal Gray & Thompson, 2001 – Victoria

References

Zoropsidae
Araneomorphae genera
Spiders of Australia